The Antibes Yacht Show is a yacht show taking place over the areas of Port Vauban, Bastion Saint Jaume, Quay Rambaud, Billionaires Quay, and Capitanerie Quay in Antibes, France.

Created by the SARL Antibes Yacht Show, it was dedicated to brokerage and charter yachts.

History

The 1st Antibes Yacht Show, in 2007, was created for people searching to charter or buy a yacht in the springtime. This first year welcomed 100 exhibitors and 65 yachts up to 57 meters. 

The second Antibes Yacht Show in April 2008 featured around 190 exhibitors and was able to accommodate 202 yachts up to 80 metres in length displayed over 1,000; metres of quayside and filling up to 15,000 square metres of the famous Port Vauban, Antibes, France. This is just the second season for the Antibes Yacht Show but it is a fitting venue to kick off the season of yacht shows as Antibes is the largest pleasure harbour in Europe. The show attracts all the biggest names in the industry as well as showcasing some of the worlds most luxurious yachts.

The 2012 Antibes Yacht Show took place from 12 to 15 April and adds a seminar day on April 13.

2014 was the last year the show occurred before shutting down.

External links
 Antibes Yacht Show

References

Boat shows
Yacht Show
Tourist attractions in Alpes-Maritimes
2007 establishments in France
2014 disestablishments in France